Sahzab (also Romanized as Sahzāb) is a village in Aghmiyun Rural District, in the Central District of Sarab County, East Azerbaijan Province, Iran. At the 2006 census, its population was 683, in 201 families.
To see beautiful photos of Sahzab village Page @my_sahzab in Instagram.

References 

Populated places in Sarab County